The 2013 South American Under-17 Women's Football Championship is the fourth instance of the South American Under-17 Women's Football Championship. It was played from 12 to 29 September in Paraguay. The top three teams qualified to the 2014 FIFA U-17 Women's World Cup to be held in Costa Rica. The tournament was won by Venezuela, winning their first title.

The tournament was originally scheduled from 7 to 25 August but rescheduled in July 2013.

Participating teams
All ten nations of CONMEBOL participated.

 (holders)

 (hosts)

Venues

Group stage
The group stage draw was held on 2 August 2013. Paraguay as hosts and Brazil as champions were fixed as heading groups A and B.

If teams finish level on points, order will be determined according to the following criteria:
 superior goal difference in all matches
 greater number of goals scored in all group matches
 better result in matches between tied teams
 drawing of lots

All match times are in local Paraguay Time (UTC−03:00).

Group A
Venue: Estadio Emiliano Ghezzi, Asunción

Group B
Venue: Estadio Feliciano Cáceres, Luque

Final round
The top two teams of each group play another round-robin. Venezuela, Colombia and Paraguay qualified to the 2014 FIFA U-17 Women's World Cup in Costa Rica.

Champions

Top scorers
8 goals
 Gabriela Garcia

6 goals
 Jessica Martínez

5 goals
 Yosneidy Zambrano

4 goals
 Bárbara Álvarez

3 goals
 Nicole González
 Valentina Restrepo
 Angie Castañeda
 Kika Moreno
 Daniuska Rodríguez

References

External links
CONMEBOL website
Tourney at soccerway.com
Tourney at futbol24.com

2013
CON
Women
International association football competitions hosted by Paraguay
2013 in youth sport
2013 in youth association football